5 is the fifth full-length studio album by American rock musician Lenny Kravitz, released on May 12, 1998, by Virgin Records. The album produced six singles released over the course of 1998 and 1999.

Background
The album featured such hits as "Fly Away" and "I Belong to You", which helped Kravitz to expand his success in Europe. The album won two Grammy Awards.

5 was re-issued in 1999, including Lenny Kravitz's latest single from the soundtrack of Austin Powers: The Spy Who Shagged Me, "American Woman", plus a bonus track called "Without You"—initially a B-side to the lead single, "If You Can't Say No".

Initially, the album received mediocre reviews by some critics, and its rise to commercial success was quite slow, until it gained traction towards the end of 1998 and throughout 1999 producing a string of worldwide hits and becoming one of the most successful albums of 1999. Despite paling in comparison in US chart position with Kravitz's other albums, it managed to have a remarkably long chart-life, charting for nearly three years straight on the Billboard 200, two of which were spent in the top 100.

The album gained Kravitz multiple awards nominations and gave him his first two Grammy Awards in the Best Male Rock Vocal Performance category for the hits "Fly Away" and "American Woman".

Critical reception
Stephen Thomas Erlewine of AllMusic stated "Without hooks, melodies, and style, Kravitz's Sly, Mayfield, Hendrix, Lennon, and Prince pastiches are a bore. 5 has a few passable cuts, yet it falls short of the quirky hero worship and melodic smarts that made his first three records so enjoyable". Jim Farber of Entertainment Weekly commented "It's useless to keep railing about Kravitz’ endless grave robbing. On 5, he shows no signs of halting his lifts from Sly Stone, Curtis Mayfield, and the Beatles. At least this time he targets some new catalogs (Gary Numan, Depeche Mode)". Robert Christgau wrote "His racially convoluted formalism having long since come clean as a total absence of original ideas, he grabs the brass ring from the back of a tacked-on Guess Who cover best heard on the far more imaginative Austin Powers soundtrack. Lenny, your work here on earth is done". A reviewer of Classic Rock Review added "This winner of two Grammy Awards, successfully found Kravitz both establishing himself as a genuine funk and R&B artist while also advancing his incredibly diverse fusion of rock and soul which he had established early on in his recording career. The result is an accessible and accomplished work that offers an array of sonic candy... While 5 is pretty solid throughout,  the second half of the album is where real gems lie with rock, funk and soul musical diversity". Stephen Thompson of The A.V. Club wrote "Kravitz's fifth album—appropriately enough, it's titled 5—has a few exhilarating fragments scattered throughout its 66 minutes. But those moments are too infrequent to be easily extracted... Kravitz's most forgiving fans will appreciate the diversity and sheer volume of 5; everyone else should give it a pass."

Production
In the production of the album, Kravitz worked with digital technology such as synthesizers and tape loops providing the album with a more modern sound. The album contained more of his '70s-inspired songs, funk and soul, mixed with his rock style.

Track listing

Personnel
Lenny Kravitz – vocals, all other instruments
Craig Ross – electric guitar, slide guitar, keyboards
Terry Manning– toy piano on "I Belong to You" and Screams on "Straight Cold Player"
Cindy Blackman – drums on "Straight Cold Player"
Jack Daley – bass guitar
Michael Hunter – trumpet
Harold Todd – saxophone
George Laks – keyboards
Alex Alvarez – keyboards
Stephen Dorff – 'uh' sounds on "American Woman"

Production
Engineered by Terry Manning except "American Woman" engineered by Matt Knobel
Recorded by Tom "T-Bone" Edmonds
Mixed by Manning and Kravitz
Pro Tools operation by Matt Knobel
Programming by Kravitz, Knobel, Mark Browne and Eric Rehl
Horn arrangements by Kravitz, Michael Hunter and Harold Todd
Art direction and design by Len Peltier
Photography by Mark Seliger

Singles
"If You Can't Say No" – No. 48 UK
"Thinking of You"
"I Belong to You" – No. 71 US, No. 75 UK
"Fly Away" – No. 12 US, No. 1 UK
"American Woman" – No. 49 US
"Black Velveteen" – No. 83 UK

Charts

Weekly charts

Year-end charts

Certifications

!scope="row"|Worldwide
|
|6,000,000 
|-

References

1998 albums
Lenny Kravitz albums
Virgin Records albums
Albums produced by Lenny Kravitz
Trip hop albums by American artists